Aristotle's views on women influenced later Western thinkers, who quoted him as an authority until the end of the Middle Ages.

Differences between males and females
Aristotle gave equal weight to women's happiness as he did to men's, commenting in his Rhetoric that a society cannot be happy unless women are happy too.  Aristotle believed that in nature a common good came of the rule of a superior being, stains in his Politics that "By nature the female has been distinguished from the slave. For nature makes nothing in the manner that the coppersmiths make the Delphic knife – that is, frugally – but, rather, it makes each thing for one purpose. For each thing would do its work most nobly if it had one task rather than many. Among the barbarians the female and the slave have the same status. This is because there are no natural rulers among them but, rather, the association among them is between male and female slave. On account of this, the poets say that 'it is fitting that Greeks rule barbarians', as the barbarian and the slave are by nature the same." But he does not indicate a common good for men being superior to women.

Women's role in inheritance

Aristotle's inheritance model sought to explain how the parents' characteristics are transmitted to the child, subject to influence from the environment. The system worked as follows. The father's semen and the mother's menses encode their parental characteristics. The model is partly asymmetric, as only the father's movements define the form or eidos of the human, while the movements of both the father's and the mother's fluids define features other than the form, such as the father's eye colour or the mother's nose shape. The theory has some symmetry, as semen movements carry maleness while the menses carry femaleness.  Aristotle thought that the female body being well-suited to reproduction entails that it has a different body temperature than the male body's. If the semen is hot enough to overpower the cold menses, the child will be a boy; but if it is too cold to do this, the child will be a girl. Inheritance is thus particulate (definitely one trait or another), as in Mendelian genetics, unlike the Hippocratic model which was continuous and blending. The child's sex can be influenced by factors that affect temperature, including the weather, the wind direction, diet, and the father's age. Features other than sex also depend on whether the semen overpowers the menses, so if a man has strong semen, he will have sons who resemble him, while if the semen is weak, he will have daughters who resemble their mother.

References

Sources
 

Women
Women and philosophy